Ancylolomia nigrifasciata is a moth in the family Crambidae. It was described by Graziano Bassi in 2004. It is found in Namibia.

References

Ancylolomia
Moths described in 2004
Moths of Africa